Yves Mourousi (born 20 July 1942 in Suresnes, Hauts-de-Seine – died on 7 April 1998 in Paris) was a French television and radio news presenter and journalist. He was the TF1 midday news ("journal de 13h00") anchor during 14 years between 1975 and 1988 and one of the most popular TV presenters at this time.

Information
His surname, Mourousi, comes from his mother, a Russian princess of Phanariote nobility.

During the 1980s, he was a member of the Association de la Presse du Music-Hall et du Cirque, a French press organization gathering journalists, critics, chroniclers, and notable personalities such as Pierre Cardin, Guy des Cars and Jean-Pierre Thiollet, interested in Music-hall and Circus, presided over by a well-known journalist, Jacqueline Cartier.<ref> L'Express, http://fiches.lexpress.fr/personnalite/jacqueline-cartier_343289/biographie</ref>

Yves Mourousi also produced special events such as the Festival de la Musique aux Armées on Paris's Place Vendôme, and Michael Stewart and Cy Coleman's hit Broadway musical, Barnum'', at the Cirque d'Hiver of Paris, which he also directed (1981).

References

1942 births
1998 deaths
French people of Russian descent
People from Suresnes
French television presenters
French television journalists
Commandeurs of the Ordre des Arts et des Lettres
Officers of the Ordre national du Mérite
French LGBT journalists
Lycée Lakanal alumni
Burials at Montparnasse Cemetery
Chevaliers of the Légion d'honneur
20th-century French LGBT people